Mat Yeung Ming (born 27 February 1981) is a Hong Kong television actor and host known for his roles as Lui Ting in Screen Play (2000), as Wan Po-yu in The 'W' Files (2003), as Tin Hoi in Be Home for Dinner (2011), and as Senior Inspector Jasper Kong in Master of Play (2012).

Career
In September 1998, Yeung signed a management contract with TVB after graduating from the company's 17th Artiste Training Class. He was given his first major role in the comedy-drama serial Screen Play (2000), where he portrayed Lui Ting, a character based on Nicholas Tse. Yeung was pushed by his company to compete in the male beauty pageant Mister World in 2000, and was misplaced. Yeung returned to Hong Kong and played a few more minor roles afterwards, before winning another major role in the teen drama Aqua Heroes and mystery/adventure drama The 'W' Files, both which aired in 2003.

In 2005, his career was interrupted when Yeung was arrested for DUI and criminal damage. He was sentenced to 150 hours of community service, and became the first TVB actor having to retake acting classes again. To make ends meet, Yeung opened a clothing retail store in Mong Kok during 2006, but the store closed down within a year of business. He tried another business with selling Chinese mitten crab, but the business went bankrupt within three months. In 2018, Yeung returned to the food business by opening up stew soup shops, stating that acting income is often unstable and would be actively participating to help. However due to the COVID-19 pandemic, Yeung had to shut down all his shops and revert to takeaway and online sales by 2022.

In 2011, Yeung's career was revived after a successful portrayal of Tin Hoi in the sitcom Be Home for Dinner. He was nominated for Most Improved Male Artiste at the 2011 TVB Anniversary Awards. He eventually won this award in 2017. Yeung got his first male leading role in the 2019 drama My Commissioned Lover.

Criminal history
In 2005, Yeung was arrested for DUI and criminal damage. He was sentenced to 150 hours of community service.

In August 2020, Yeung was arrested for his involvement in a car collision, after refusing to provide a blood sample to the police when they noted the smell of alcohol in his breath. Yeung's ongoing promotional campaigns for the Hong Kong Police Force were suspended after his arrest.  He won a last-minute bid for freedom after a magistrate decided to remand him in custody over two driving offences, only to later allow him to reverse his guilty plea on the grounds that he had received “improper” legal advice.

In November 2021, he was found guilty of all three charges and sentenced to 18 days in prison. During the trial, it was also mentioned that Yeung in a separate incident had been fined for using his mobile phone while driving.

In September 2022, judge Johnny Chan Jong-herng told Yeung that evidence for his careless driving charge was "rock-solid". Yeung was released on bail for HK$100,000 and ordered to not leave Hong Kong, to report to the police every Wednesday, and to not drive while on bail. A traffic cop at the scene and medical report showed that Yeung committed drunk driving.

In December 2022, Yeung lost his appeal, and the judge found Yeung only have "average" levels of remorse, said Yeung's plea was "capricious," and also said evidence against Yeung was "ironclad."

Political views
Yeung is a staunch supporter of the pro-Beijing camp, being very outspoken among the entertainment industry. 

Yeung's critical stance urged people to disassociate themselves from the violence and voice their support for police officers. Due to his position on the protests, protesters have targeted him, which has led to boycotts of television shows he has starred in and his shops across Hong Kong.  Conversely, he remarked: "Whether the business is good or not doesn't bother me, but I am very sad that rioters became more and more violent in streets and more common people got hurt." He further explained that: "At this time, business is not that important anymore. Now it's the struggle for humanity that matters, we must return to humanity. I feel that in the past months, humanity is lost in Hong Kong."

During the protests, Yeung was found insulting the protesters in a WhatsApp group with foul language, "All guys are fxxking crazy" (佢老味成班癲X咗). His words were criticised by Flow Leung, another TVB artist, who claimed that two TVB staff left the group chat in anger and felt that Yeung went overboard when laughing at the two leaving the group chat. Yeung claimed he has made no judgement on peaceful protesters and criticized Leung for quoting him out of context.

Yeung, who is well known for playing police figures, commented: "I can see our selfless police officers work so hard to protect us. However, some people kept smearing them and cooking up fake news to mislead the public." During the protests in November 2019, Yeung helped the police in clearing roadblocks established by the protesters.

Yeung signed a petition in support of the national security law.

Filmography

References

External links

1981 births
Living people
Hong Kong male actors
TVB veteran actors
TVB actors